George and the Unbreakable Code is a 2014 children's book written by Stephen and Lucy Hawking. The book is the fourth book in the George series, following George's Secret Key to the Universe, George's Cosmic Treasure Hunt, and George and the Big Bang, and preceding George and the Blue Moon.

See also 

 A Brief History of Time by Stephen Hawking
 Black Holes and Baby Universes and Other Essays by Stephen Hawking
 George's Secret Key to the Universe
 George's Cosmic Treasure Hunt
 George and the Big Bang
 George and the Blue Moon

References 

2014 children's books
2014 science fiction novels
British children's novels
Children's science fiction novels
British science fiction novels
Popular science books
Books by Stephen Hawking
Doubleday (publisher) books
2014 British novels